Olesya (Lesya) Vladimirovna Yaroslavskaya (born 20 March 1981, Severomorsk, Murmansk Oblast, RSFSR, USSR) is a Russian pop singer, lead singer of Viktor Drobysh's girls band Тootsie (2004–2012), author and performer of her own songs.

Early life
Yaroslavskaya was born in the closed city of Severomorsk, where her father worked as a military officer and her mother as a music teacher. Yaroslavskaya started performing from the age of four, when she sang the song Junk Letters in the local House of Culture. At the age of seven, she and her parents moved to Naro-Fominsk. There, she started studying piano. During her teen years, she regularly took part in music festivals, including in her birth town. After finishing her secondary school, Yaroslavskaya enrolled in the Moscow Regional College of Art, specialising in pop-jazz music. Subsequently, in 2001, she entered the Institute of Modern Art, where she completed a degree in pop music.

Career

Yaroslavskaya auditioned for the third season of the Russian reality music competition Fabrika Zvyozd, where she became one of the sixteen contestants. Eventually, she finished eight overall, being eliminated in the tenth reporting concert. After the show had ended, Yaroslavskaya — alongside Irina Ortman, Mariya Veber and Anastasia Krainova — was put into a girlband which was named Tootsie. Yaroslavskaya signed a contract with producer Viktor Drobysh for seven years.

In 2004, Yaroslavskaya won the audition to become the second presenter of Dom-2 alongside Ksenia Sobchak, but she had to reject the position due to contractual obligations she had with Channel One Russia.

After the Fabrika Zvyozd tour ended, Tootsie released their first record Best, Best in August 2004, which peaked at #10 in the TopHit airplay charts. In that period, Tootsie grew out to one of the most commercially successful all-women groups in Russia. Yaroslavskaya stayed in the group until 2008, when she shortly left on maternity leave. She returned afterwards, but similarly to Ortman and Veber, Yaroslavsksya started a solo career. In 2012, the group officially disbanded. 

Yaroslavskaya released her first solo record titled Not With Me in 2011, which achieved moderate radio airplay in Russia. In 2014, she released her first extended play Heart Worries through Freestyle Records. She frequently performed in front of army officers, for which she was decorated with the medal "For Service in the North Caucasus" in 2009, later with the medal "200 Years of MIA Russia", the medal "200 Years of the St. George's Cross" and the medal "For Distinction in Service" (2nd class) in 2012. In 2021, she said that she earns most of her money through teaching vocal classes in the Central School of Arts. 

In 2019, Yaroslavskaya revealed that Tootsie was returning as four-piece girlband with Ortman, Veber and Rostova. The group made an appearance during Muz-TV's Golden Hits concert, where they sang Best, Best.

Personal life
Yaroslavskaya married an army officer in 2002. They have a daughter, born in 2008.

Discography

Extended plays

Singles

References

External links
 Official Website
 
 

1981 births
Living people
Russian pop singers
Singers from Moscow
People from Severomorsk
Fabrika Zvyozd
Institute of Contemporary Art, Moscow alumni
21st-century Russian singers